Abu 'l-Fadl Muhammad ibn Abi Abdallah al-Husayn ibn Muhammad al-Katib, commonly known after his father as Ibn al-'Amid (died 970) was a Persian statesman who served as the vizier of the Buyid ruler Rukn al-Dawla for thirty years, from 940 until his death in 970. His son, also called Ibn al-'Amid, succeeded him in his office.

Biography 

Abu 'l-Fadl was from a low-class family. He was the son of a wheat merchant from Qom, who served as a kātib in Khurasan and later attained the rank of ʿamīd. In 933, he was the vizier of Vushmgir. He was later taken captive by the Samanids. He was assassinated at Isfahan around 935.

Abu 'l-Fadl is first mentioned in 940, when the Buyid ruler Rukn al-Dawla, who greatly favored him, appointed him as his vizier. In 948, Abu 'l-Fadl served as the tutor of Rukn al-Dawla's son 'Adud al-Dawla. In ca. 955, a son of Abu 'l-Fadl's father's former overlord, Muhammad ibn Makan, marched towards the domains of Rukn al-Dawla, conquering the important cities Isfahan and Ray. During their invasion, Abu 'l-Fadl tried to repel them, but was defeated. However, in a second battle, with the aid of Adud al-Dawla, he managed to rout them, reconquer lost territory, and capture their leader Muhammad. Another Dailamite military officer named Ruzbahan also shortly rebelled against Mu'izz al-Dawla, while his brother Bullaka rebelled against Adud al-Dawla at Shiraz. Abu 'l-Fadl, however, managed to suppress the rebellion. In the 960s, the prominent official Ibn Miskawayh served Abu 'l-Fadl as his chief librarian in an important library in Ray.

In 966, Abu 'l-Fadl was wounded during an invasion by ghazis from Khorasan, who plundered much of Jibal, and marched towards the great library of Ray, which was, however, saved by Ibn Miskawayh. Rukn al-Dawla shortly managed to repel them. The next year, under the orders of Rukn al-Dawla, Abu 'l-Fadl conquered Azerbaijan, and restored the Sallarid Ibrahim I ibn Marzuban I as the ruler of the region, but shortly urged Rukn al-Dawla to depose Ibrahim and impose direct Buyid control on the region. Rukn al-Dawla, however, declined his advice. In 970, Abu 'l-Fadl was sent on an expedition to the Kurdish ruler Hasanwayh, but died before he managed to deal with the latter, and was shortly succeeded as vizier by his son Abu'l-Fath, who shortly managed to deal with Hasanwayh.

Work 
Abu 'l-Fadl enjoyed an excellent reputation as a scholar and became the centre of a literary circle. Amongst his outstanding contributions to science is his book entitled "Building Cities" in which he describes building methods and construction planning. The book exists as an original manuscript in one of the Arabic and Islamic libraries in Istanbul, Turkey.

References

Sources 
 
 
 
 
 
 
 

Year of birth unknown
970 deaths
Iranian scholars
10th-century scholars
Buyid viziers
10th-century Iranian politicians
People from Qom